The 1975–76 Calgary Cowboys season was the fourth season of the World Hockey Association (WHA) franchise and first in Calgary, Alberta. The Vancouver Blazers relocated to Calgary prior to the season. The Cowboys qualified for the playoffs, losing in the second round to the Winnipeg Jets.

Offseason

Regular season
In their first season, the Cowboys were not expected to ice a strong team, having inherited a franchise that finished in a last place tie with the Oilers the previous year.  Calgary finished 41–35–4 however, as a 44-goal season by Danny Lawson and 42 goals from Ron Chipperfield helped the Cowboys finish a surprising third in the Canadian division.

Final standings

Game log

Playoffs
In the playoffs, the Cowboys met the Quebec Nordiques in the first round. The series is best known for one of hockey's most legendary brawls.  The incident began when Calgary's Rick Jodzio cross-checked Quebec's Marc Tardif in the head, causing both teams to leave their benches. The brawl lasted 20 minutes, and ended only when Quebec police gathered at the players benches and escorted the teams back to their dressing rooms.  The game resumed following a 20-minute break to allow both teams to cool down, then resumed without eleven players who were ejected from the game.  The incident caught the attention of Quebec's Solicitor General Fernand Lalonde, who had the incident investigated as a criminal matter. Jodzio was suspended indefinitely by the league, and later pleaded guilty in a Quebec court to a charge of assault over the incident.  Cowboys coach Joe Crozier was suspended for the rest of the series.

Calgary went on to defeat the Nordiques, who had finished 18-points ahead of Calgary in the regular season, but were defeated by the Winnipeg Jets in the second round. The team never really captured the attention of Calgarians, as fewer than 5,000 fans, on average, attended playoff games against the Jets.

Calgary Cowboys 4, Quebec Nordiques 1

Winnipeg Jets 4, Calgary Cowboys 1

Player stats

Note: Pos = Position; GP = Games played; G = Goals; A = Assists; Pts = Points; +/- = plus/minus; PIM = Penalty minutes; PPG = Power-play goals; SHG = Short-handed goals; GWG = Game-winning goals
      MIN = Minutes played; W = Wins; L = Losses; T = Ties; GA = Goals-against; GAA = Goals-against average; SO = Shutouts;

Awards and records

Transactions

Draft picks
Calgary's draft picks at the 1975 WHA Amateur Draft.

Farm teams

See also
1975–76 WHA season

Notes

References

External links

Cal
Cal
Calgary Cowboys